The following is an alphabetical list of articles related to the U.S. state of Idaho.

0–9 

.id.us – Internet second-level domain for the state of Idaho
43rd state to join the United States of America
North American ice storm of January 1961

A
Adams-Onís Treaty of 1819
Adjacent states and province:

Agriculture in Idaho
:Category:Agriculture in Idaho
commons:Category:Agriculture in Idaho
Airports in Idaho, List of
American Redoubt
Amphibians and reptiles of Idaho
Amusement parks in Idaho
Arboreta in Idaho
commons:Category:Arboreta in Idaho
Archaeology of Idaho
:Category:Archaeological sites in Idaho
commons:Category:Archaeological sites in Idaho
Architecture in Idaho
commons:Category:Buildings in Idaho
Area codes in Idaho, List of
Astronomical observatories in Idaho
commons:Category:Astronomical observatories in Idaho

B
Boise, Idaho, territorial and state capital since 1865
Botanical gardens in Idaho
commons:Category:Botanical gardens in Idaho
Buildings and structures in Idaho
commons:Category:Buildings and structures in Idaho

C

Canyons and gorges of Idaho
commons:Category:Canyons and gorges of Idaho
Capitol of the State of Idaho, Boise, Idaho
commons:Category:Idaho State Capitol
Caves of Idaho
commons:Category:Caves of Idaho
Census statistical areas of Idaho

Cities in Idaho, List of
commons:Category:Cities in Idaho
Climate of Idaho
Climate change in Idaho
Colleges and universities in Idaho, List of
commons:Category:Universities and colleges in Idaho
Communications in Idaho
commons:Category:Communications in Idaho
Companies in Idaho
Congressional districts of Idaho
Constitution of the State of Idaho
Convention centers in Idaho
commons:Category:Convention centers in Idaho
Counties of the state of Idaho, List of
commons:Category:Counties in Idaho
Culture of Idaho
commons:Category:Idaho culture

D
Demographics of Idaho

E
Economy of Idaho
:Category:Economy of Idaho
commons:Category:Economy of Idaho
Education in Idaho
:Category:Education in Idaho
commons:Category:Education in Idaho
Elections in the state of Idaho
commons:Category:Idaho elections
Environment of Idaho
commons:Category:Environment of Idaho

F

Festivals in Idaho
commons:Category:Festivals in Idaho
Flag of the state of Idaho
Forts in Idaho
:Category:Forts in Idaho
commons:Category:Forts in Idaho

G

Geography of Idaho
:Category:Geography of Idaho
commons:Category:Geography of Idaho
Geology of Idaho
:Category:Geology of Idaho
commons:Category:Geology of Idaho
Geysers of Idaho
commons:Category:Geysers of Idaho
Ghost towns in Idaho, List of
:Category:Ghost towns in Idaho
commons:Category:Ghost towns in Idaho
Golf clubs and courses in Idaho
Government of the State of Idaho  website
:Category:Government of Idaho
commons:Category:Government of Idaho
Governor of the State of Idaho
List of governors of Idaho
Great Seal of the State of Idaho

H
Health care in Idaho
High schools of Idaho, List of
Higher education in Idaho, List of
Highway routes in Idaho, List of
Interstate Highway routes in Idaho, List of
U.S. Highway routes in Idaho, List of
Hiking trails in Idaho
commons:Category:Hiking trails in Idaho
History of Idaho
Historical outline of Idaho
:Category:History of Idaho
commons:Category:History of Idaho
Hospitals in Idaho, List of
Hot springs of Idaho
commons:Category:Hot springs of Idaho
House of Representatives of the State of Idaho

I
ID, List of – United States Postal Service postal code for the state of Idaho
Idaho  website
:Category:Idaho
commons:Category:Idaho
commons:Category:Maps of Idaho
Idaho State Capitol
Images of Idaho
commons:Category:Idaho

J

K

L
Lakes of Idaho
commons:Category:Lakes of Idaho
Landmarks in Idaho
commons:Category:Landmarks in Idaho
Legislation, Idaho
Lewis and Clark Expedition, 1804-1806
Lewiston, Idaho, first territorial capital 1863-1865
Lieutenant Governor of the State of Idaho
Lists related to the state of Idaho:
List of airports in Idaho
List of census statistical areas in Idaho
List of cities in Idaho
List of colleges and universities in Idaho
List of companies based in Idaho
List of United States congressional districts in Idaho
List of counties in Idaho
List of dams and reservoirs in Idaho
List of forts in Idaho
List of ghost towns in Idaho
List of governors of Idaho
List of high schools in Idaho
List of highway routes in Idaho
List of hospitals in Idaho
List of individuals executed in Idaho
List of lakes in Idaho
List of law enforcement agencies in Idaho
List of museums in Idaho
List of National Historic Landmarks in Idaho
List of newspapers in Idaho
List of people from Idaho
List of places in Idaho
List of power stations in Idaho
List of radio stations in Idaho
List of railroads in Idaho
List of Registered Historic Places in Idaho
List of rivers of Idaho
List of school districts in Idaho
List of state forests in Idaho
List of state parks in Idaho
List of state prisons in Idaho
List of symbols of the State of Idaho
List of telephone area codes in Idaho
List of television stations in Idaho
List of United States congressional delegations from Idaho
List of United States congressional districts in Idaho
List of United States representatives from Idaho
List of United States senators from Idaho

M
Maps of Idaho
commons:Category:Maps of Idaho
Mass media in Idaho
Mountains of Idaho
commons:Category:Mountains of Idaho
Museums in Idaho, List of
:Category:Museums in Idaho
commons:Category:Museums in Idaho
Music of Idaho
commons:Category:Music of Idaho
:Category:Musical groups from Idaho
:Category:Musicians from Idaho

N
National Forests of Idaho
commons:Category:National Forests of Idaho
Natural history of Idaho
commons:Category:Natural history of Idaho
Newspapers of Idaho, List of

O
Oregon Country, 1818–1846
Oregon Treaty of 1846

P
People from Idaho, List of
:Category:People from Idaho
commons:Category:People from Idaho
:Category:People by city in Idaho
:Category:People by county in Idaho
:Category:People from Idaho by occupation
Places in Idaho, List of
Politics of Idaho
commons:Category:Politics of Idaho
Protected areas of Idaho
commons:Category:Protected areas of Idaho

Q

R
Radio stations in Idaho, List of
Railroads in Idaho, List of
Registered historic places in Idaho, List of
commons:Category:Registered Historic Places in Idaho
Religion in Idaho - Idaho Main
:Category:Religion in Idaho
commons:Category:Religion in Idaho
Rivers of Idaho
commons:Category:Rivers of Idaho
Rock formations in Idaho
commons:Category:Rock formations in Idaho
Roller coasters in Idaho
commons:Category:Roller coasters in Idaho
Ruby Ridge

S
School districts of Idaho, List of
Scouting in Idaho
Senate of the State of Idaho
Settlements in Idaho
Cities in Idaho
Census Designated Places in Idaho
Other unincorporated communities in Idaho
List of ghost towns in Idaho
List of places in Idaho, List of
Ski areas and resorts in Idaho
commons:Category:Ski areas and resorts in Idaho
Snake River
Solar power in Idaho
Sports in Idaho - Idaho Main
:Category:Sports in Idaho
commons:Category:Sports in Idaho
:Category:Sports venues in Idaho
commons:Category:Sports venues in Idaho
State Capitol of Idaho
State of Idaho  website
Constitution of the State of Idaho
Government of the state of Idaho
:Category:Government of Idaho
commons:Category:Government of Idaho
Executive branch of the government of the state of Idaho
Governor of the State of Idaho
Legislative branch of the government of the state of Idaho
Legislature of the State of Idaho
Senate of the State of Idaho
House of Representatives of the State of Idaho
Judicial branch of the government of the state of Idaho
Supreme Court of the State of Idaho
State parks of Idaho, List of
commons:Category:State parks of Idaho
State prisons of Idaho, List of
Structures in Idaho
commons:Category: Buildings and structures in Idaho
Sun Valley, Idaho
Supreme Court of the State of Idaho
Symbols of the state of Idaho, List of
:Category:Symbols of Idaho
commons:Category:Symbols of Idaho

T
Telecommunications in Idaho
commons:Category:Communications in Idaho
Telephone area codes in Idaho, List of
Television stations in Idaho, List of
Territory of Idaho, 1863–1890
Territory of Oregon, 1848–1859
Territory of Washington, (1853–1863)-1889
Tourism in Idaho  website
commons:Category:Tourism in Idaho
Transportation in Idaho
:Category:Transportation in Idaho
commons:Category:Transport in Idaho

U
United States of America
States of the United States of America
United States census statistical areas of Idaho
United States congressional delegations from Idaho
United States congressional districts in Idaho
United States Court of Appeals for the Ninth Circuit
United States District Court for the District of Idaho
United States representatives from Idaho, List of
United States senators from Idaho, List of
Universities and colleges in Idaho, List of
commons:Category:Universities and colleges in Idaho
US-ID – ISO 3166-2:US region code for the State of Idaho

V

W
Water parks in Idaho
Waterfalls of Idaho
commons:Category:Waterfalls of Idaho
Wikimedia
Wikimedia Commons:Category:Idaho
commons:Category:Maps of Idaho
Wikinews:Category:Idaho
Wikinews:Portal:Idaho
Wikipedia Category:Idaho
Wikipedia:WikiProject Idaho
:Category:WikiProject Idaho articles
:Category:WikiProject Idaho participants
Wind power in Idaho

X

Y

Z
Zoos
Pocatello Zoo
Tautphaus Park Zoo
Zoo Boise

See also

Topic overview:
Idaho
Outline of Idaho

Idaho
 
Idaho